Xieji Township is a township of Linquan County in northwestern Anhui province, China, located about  from the border with Henan and  south-southeast of the county seat. , it has 10 villages under its administration.

See also 
 List of township-level divisions of Anhui

References 

Township-level divisions of Anhui